= Lenovo Watch =

The Lenovo Watch is a smartwatch product by Lenovo.

== Lenovo Watch 9 ==
The Lenovo Watch 9 costs $20, an analog hybrid smart watch that is waterproof. The design of the watch has a classic face and has Bluetooth 5.0. The watch runs on a single cell battery that lasts up to 4-8 months. The watch also monitors sleep, steps, and calories.

== Lenovo Watch S ==
The Lenovo Watch S is a budget smartwatch introduced by Lenovo in June 2025. It features a 1.43-inch circular AMOLED display with a resolution of 466 × 466 pixels, housed in a stainless steel case measuring 0.9 cm in thickness. The device is supplied with two interchangeable straps, including a leather strap with a magnetic clasp.

The Watch S is designed for health and fitness tracking and supports more than 70 sports modes. It provides continuous health monitoring, including heart rate tracking via an intelligent algorithm, sleep tracking, calorie measurement, health reminders, and an emergency SOS function. The smartwatch includes a built-in microphone and speaker, enabling Bluetooth 5.3 calling directly from the device. Additional features include local music playback and voice navigation. The Watch S carries an IP68 rating, indicating resistance to water and dust.

The device is powered by a 300mAh battery, offering up to 7 days of battery life under typical usage and up to 10 days with moderate use. The Lenovo Watch S is priced at 499 Yuan (approximately US$70) and is currently available in China, with no announced plans for international release.

== Lenovo Watch X ==
The Lenovo Watch X is a smartwatch introduced by Lenovo in 2018, and priced at US$70. The Watch X hardware has had security issues. The watch features a 1.5 inch OLED display, cased in a zinc alloy casing, with a stainless steel and milanese band.

Display: 1.5 inch OLED
Connectivity: Bluetooth 5.0
Sensors: Optical Heart Rate, :Pedometer, Sleep Tracking
Battery: 600mAh
Watch Casing: Zinc alloy
Band: Stainless Steel, Milanese
Weight: 0.0810 kg
Dimensions: 9.65 x 1.67 x 0.48 inches
Waterproof Rating: Unspecified
